Expecting is a 2013 American comedy film written and directed by Jessie McCormack. The film stars Michelle Monaghan, Radha Mitchell, Jon Dore, Michael Weston and Mimi Kennedy. The film was released on December 6, 2013, by Tribeca Film.

Cast
Michelle Monaghan as Andie
Radha Mitchell as Lizzie
Jon Dore as Peter
Michael Weston as Casey
Mimi Kennedy as Dr. Grayson

Release
The film premiered at South by Southwest on March 11, 2013. The film was released on December 6, 2014, by Tribeca Film.

References

External links
 
 

2013 films
2010s pregnancy films
2013 comedy films
American comedy films
American pregnancy films
2013 directorial debut films
2010s English-language films
2010s American films